NGC 596 is an elliptical galaxy in the constellation Cetus. The galaxy lies 65 million light years away from Earth, which means, given its apparent dimensions, that NGC 596 is approximately 60,000 light years across. The galaxy shows an outer envelope and is a merger remnant. The surface brightness profil is smooth and featureless. The galaxy hosts a supermassive black hole, whose mass is estimated to be 170 million (108.24) .

NGC 596 belongs at the NGC 584 galaxy group, which also includes the galaxies NGC 584, which lies 25 minutes to the northwest, NGC 600, NGC 615 and NGC 636.

The galaxy is included in the Herschel 400 Catalogue. It lies about 2 and half degrees northeast from theta Ceti.

References

External links 

Elliptical galaxies
Cetus (constellation)
0596
005766